Quintus Aponius was one of the commanders of the troops under the command of Gaius Trebonius, Caesar's lieutenant in Hispania.  In 46 BC Aponius' men and those of other commanders under Trebonius revolted.

Aponius was proscribed by the triumvirs in 43, and put to death.

See also
Aponia gens

References

1st-century BC Romans
43 BC deaths
Year of birth unknown
Aponii